Larry Todd Rose (born November 28, 1974) is the co-founder and president of Populace, a Boston-based think tank. Prior to Populace, Rose was a professor at the Harvard University where he served as the faculty director of the Mind, Brain, and Education program, as well as led the Laboratory for the Science of Individuality. He is a scientist in developmental psychology known for his work applying dynamical systems principles to the study of development, intelligence, and learning, and for his contributions to the field of Educational Neuroscience. His current focus is in the area of the Science of the Individual, with an emphasis on applying insights about individuality to issues of human potential, talent development, and the design of social institutions.  Rose is the author of The End of Average, Dark Horse, and Collective Illusions.

Early life and education 
Rose was born in Ogden, Utah (1974). He has stated publicly that he struggled in school from an early age, and that he dropped out of Layton High School his senior year (1993), as at the time, he had a 0.9 GPA. In 1995, after being on welfare and working multiple minimum wage jobs to support his wife and two children, he obtained his GED and started attending night classes at a local college. Rose eventually received a Bachelor of Science in psychology from Weber State University (2000), as well as a master's degree in Mind, Brain, and Education (2001) and a Doctorate in Human Development (2007) from the Harvard Graduate School of Education, where he worked with notable psychologist Kurt W. Fischer. He also completed a postdoctoral fellowship with the Laboratory for Visual Learning at the Center for Astrophysics  Harvard & Smithsonian (2008).

Science of the Individual 
In an excerpt from the book, Rose relates that in the 1940s, after multiple flying accidents, the US Air Force required adjustable airplane cockpit equipment when measurements revealed zero pilots were in the average range of 10 body measurements from a population of 4,063 pilots. The measurements revealed that with only three of the ten size measurements, neck circumference, thigh circumference and wrist circumference, fewer than 3.5 per cent of pilots would fit within the average sizes on the three measurements. If a cockpit was designed for an average pilot, the cockpit fit no pilot. Rose's TEDx talk, "The Myth of Average", communicates the basic principles of the science of the individual and shows how its findings can be harnessed by parents, teachers, managers, and individuals to improve performance.

Populace 
To socialize insights from the Science of the Individual, and use its findings to advance public systems and culture change, Rose co-founded Populace with Parisa Rouhani. Populace is a Boston-based 501c3 think tank focused on advancing opportunities, so all people have the chance to live fulfilling lives in a thriving society.

Books 
 Rose, Todd (2022). Collective Illusions: Conformity, Complicity, and the Science of Why We Make Bad Decisions. New York, NY. Hachette Books 
 Rose, Todd and Ogi Ogas (2018). Dark Horse: Achieving success through the pursuit of fulfillment. New York, NY. HarperCollins 
 Rose, Todd (2015). The End of Average: How We Succeed in a World That Values Sameness. New York, NY. HarperOne. 
 Rose, Todd and Ellison, Katherine  (2013). Square Peg: My Story and What it Means for Raising Innovators, Visionaries, and Out of the Box Thinkers. New York, NY. Hachette Books.

Notable publications 
 Osher, D., Cantor, P., Berg, J., Steyer, L., & Rose, T. (2020). Drivers of human development: How relationships and context shape learning and development. Applied Developmental Science, 24(1), 6-36.
 Cantor, P., Osher, D., Berg, J., Steyer, L., & Rose, T. (2019). Malleability, plasticity, and individuality: How children learn and develop in context1. Applied Developmental Science, 23(4), 307–337.
 Rifai, N., Rose, T., McMahon, G. T., Saxberg, B., & Christensen, U. J. (2018). Learning in the 21st Century: Concepts and Tools. Clinical chemistry, 64(10), 1423–1429.
 Stafford‐Brizard, K. B., Cantor, P., & Rose, L. T. (2017). Building the bridge between science and practice: Essential characteristics of a translational framework. Mind, Brain, and Education, 11(4), 155–165.
 Rose, L. T., Rouhani, P., & Fischer, K. W. (2013). The science of the individual. Mind, Brain, and Education, 7(3), 152–158.
 Rose, L.T., & Fischer, K.F. (2011). Garbage in, garbage out: Having useful data is everything. Measurement, 9, 222–226.
 Rose, L.T., Daley, S.G., & Rose, D.H. (2011). Let the questions be your guide: MBE as interdisciplinary science. Mind, Brain, and Education, 5(4), 153–162.
 Rose, L.T., & Fischer, K.W. (2011). The dynamics of childhood intelligence. In R.J. Sternberg & S.B. Kaufman (Eds.) The Cambridge Handbook of Intelligence. Cambridge, UK: Cambridge University Press.
 Rose, L.T., & Fischer, K.W. (2009). Dynamic systems theory. In R. Shweder, T. Bidell, A. Dailey et al. (Eds.), The child: An encyclopedic companion. Chicago: University of Chicago Press.
 Rose, L.T., & Fischer, K.W. (2009). Dynamic development: A neo-Piagetian approach. In U. Mueller, J.M. Carpendale, & Smith, L. (Eds.), The Cambridge Companion to Piaget, Cambridge, UK: Cambridge University Press.
 Schneps, M.H., Rose, L.T., Martinez-Conde, S., & Pomplun, M. (2009). Covert orienting reflex: Involuntary pupil response predicts microsaccade production. Vision, 9(8), 399.
 Schneps, M.H., Rose, L.T., & Fischer, K.W. (2007). Visual learning and the brain. Mind, Brain, and Education, 1(3), 128–139.
 Fischer, K.W., & Rose, L.T., & Rose, S. (2007). Growth cycles of mind and brain: Analyzing developmental pathways of learning disorders. In K.W. Fischer, J.H. Bernstein, & Immordino-Yang, M.H. (Eds.), Mind, Brain, & Education in Reading Disorders. Cambridge University Press.
 Paré-Blagoev, E. J., Cestnick, L., Rose, L.T., Clark, J., Misra, M., Katzir-Cohen, T., & Poldrack, R. (2002). The neural basis of phonological awareness in normal-reading children examined using functional magnetic resonance imaging. Journal of Cognitive Neuroscience, F53, 159.
 Fischer, K.W., & Rose, L.T. (2001). Webs of skill: How students learn. Educational Leadership, 59, 6–12.
 McVaugh, W., Mabrey, I., & Rose, L.T. (2000). Learning styles and knowledge learned in web and traditional college courses. International Journal of Psychology, S35, 247.

Personal life 
Rose and his family live in Burlington, Massachusetts. Son of Larry and Lyda (Burton), Rose is the oldest of five siblings and spent the early years of his life in Hooper, Utah. He later relocated with his family to Layton, Utah before moving to Cambridge, Massachusetts.

References

External links 
 Todd Rose's faculty page at Harvard Graduate School of Education
 Publisher’s website for Square Peg
 Publisher’s website for The End of Average
 TEDx Talks: Todd Rose on The Myth of Average at TEDx SonomaCounty in 2013
 Todd's ResearchGate page
 Video of Rose's presentation on The End of Average at Harvard in 2015

1974 births
Living people
21st-century American psychologists
Harvard Graduate School of Education faculty
Weber State University alumni
Harvard Graduate School of Education alumni
People from Hooper, Utah
People from Layton, Utah
People from Cambridge, Massachusetts